Giovanni Speranza (born 6 March 1982 in Giessen) is a German-Italian footballer.

External links
Die letzten Wechsel in der Oberliga 

1982 births
Living people
German footballers
Association football midfielders
Expatriate footballers in Bulgaria
Expatriate footballers in Slovakia
Expatriate footballers in Vietnam
Eintracht Frankfurt players
Eintracht Frankfurt II players
PFC Slavia Sofia players
A.C. Monza players
SV Waldhof Mannheim players
FC DAC 1904 Dunajská Streda players
Slovak Super Liga players
Sportspeople from Giessen
First Professional Football League (Bulgaria) players
Footballers from Hesse